Halleck is an unincorporated community in Monongalia County, West Virginia, United States.

The community was named after General H. W. Halleck.

References 

Unincorporated communities in West Virginia
Unincorporated communities in Monongalia County, West Virginia